Lesley Turner may refer to:

Lesley Turner Bowrey (born 1942), Australian tennis player
Lesley Turner (Miss Ireland) (born 1983), Irish beauty queen